Cyperus mwinilungensis is a species of sedge that is native to southern parts of Africa.

See also 
 List of Cyperus species

References 

mwinilungensis
Plants described in 1961
Flora of Tanzania
Flora of Botswana
Flora of Zambia
Flora of Zimbabwe